Statistics from the 2014 Barbados Premier Division:

References 

2014
Barb
Barb
football